Nagercoil, also spelt as Nagarkovil ("Temple of the Nāgas", or Nagaraja-Temple), is a city and the administrative headquarters of Kanyakumari District in Tamil Nadu state, India. Situated close to the tip of the Indian peninsula, it lies on an undulating terrain between the Western Ghats and the Arabian Sea. Nagercoil Corporation is the 12th biggest city of Tamil Nadu.

The present city of Nagercoil grew around Kottar, a mercantile town that dates back to the Sangam period. Kottar is now a locality within the city limits. For 735 years it was a central part of the erstwhile Travancore kingdom and later Kerala State – till almost a decade after India's independence from Britain in 1947. In 1956, Kanyakumari District, along with the town, was merged with Tamil Nadu.

Nagercoil is a centre for a range of economic activities in the small but densely-populated Kanyakumari District. Economic activities in around the city include tourism, wind energy, IT services, marine fish production and exports, rubber and cloves plantations, agro-crops, floral production, manufacture of fishnets, rubber products among other activities.

'Nagercoil Cloves' is a distinct quality of dried cloves in the spices market, noted for its aroma and medicinal value. Cloves, pepper and other spices are grown in estates in the Western Ghats, outside the town.

Nagercoil is also the nearest city to the ISRO Propulsion Complex, Mahendragiri and the Kudankulam Nuclear Power Plant.

The city, along with the district of Kanyakumari, stands at the top in many HDI parameters in Tamil Nadu state, including education, per capita income, health indices, etc.

The municipality of Nagercoil was upgraded as a Municipal corporation on the eve of its 100th year as a city on February 14, 2019.

History 
Nagercoil derives from the Tamil expression Nagaraja koyil, meaning "temple of Nagas".

Robert Caldwell describes the extent of Malayalam in the mid 19th century as extending from the vicinity of Mangalore in the north where it supersedes with Tulu and Kannada to Kottar beyond Pahrali River near Kanyakumari in the south where it begins to supersede with the Tamil and from Malabar Coast in the west to Western Ghats in the east besides the inhabited islands of Lakshadweep in the Arabian Sea. It was from the ancient trade centre of Kottar from where the city of Nagercoil began to expand.

Known as the Granary of Travancore, Nagercoil not only served as the food basket of Kerala, but was also one among the important spice-trading centers in the kingdom of Travancore from the 14th century onward, and maintained a trade network with Arab merchants from the pre-Islamic era. Various Tamil and Kerala kings fought over this rich agricultural land, which boasted six rivers. Various historians cite that the land's climate and diverse, luxuriant vegetation had no comparison anywhere else in Tamil Nadu.

The naturalist Jivanayakam Cyril Daniel (1927–2011) was born in Nagercoil.

Demographics

According to the 2021 estimation, Nagercoil had an estimated population of 6,22,759  with a female-male sex ratio of 1.05, well above the national average of 0.929 females/male. A total of 20,241 were under the age of six, constituting 10,119 males and 10,122 females. Scheduled Castes and Scheduled Tribes accounted for 4.19% and 0.17% of the population respectively. The literacy rate of the city was 96.99%. The city had a total of 59,997 households. There were a total of 76,345 workers, comprising 244 cultivators, 1,155 main agricultural laborers, 2,271 in household industries, 67,050 other workers, 5,625 marginal workers, 110 marginal cultivators, 361 marginal agricultural laborers, 447 marginal workers in household industries and 4,707 other marginal workers.

Economy

The city is one among the 50 Indian cities to be ranked in the World Startup Index of 1,000 cities. The major software companies present in Nagercoil are CapeStart Inc., Hinduja Global Solutions, Navigant Consulting and American stock exchange NASDAQ. The city also has small aerospace manufacturing plants and satellite fabricating firms serving the Indian Space Research Organisations facility in ISRO Propulsion Complex, Mahendragiri. The Regional Academic Centre for Space by Indian Space Research Organisation, one among the only six incubation centers for Space Startups in India, is under construction in Nagercoil. The Integral Coach Factory has a small scale windmill unit. The export of 95 tons of fruits and vegetables to the Gulf Countries through the Thiruvananthapuram airports is a major source of revenue for the city, with food processing companies generating a daily revenue of ₹16.7 lakh and an annual revenue of ₹6.1 billion. The flower market of Thovalai exports 350 tons of Flowers to Kerala, Europe and Middle Eastern countries generating an annual revenue of ₹250 crore.
The major cottage industries like Fish-net manufacturing, Rubber industries, Jewellery manufacturing are industries serving the domestic and export markets. The minor cottage industries include Surgical Gloves, Coir-making, floral trade, handloom-weaving, cashew nut, spices, food-processing units, and lace-making (export-oriented). Nagercoil has the highest per capita income of ₹2,76,454 (US$3,800), making it among the richest small cities in India.

Energy

The city has an installed windmill capacity of 1500 MW catering to 20% of the state's renewable electricity needs. Muppandhal has emerged as the wind power hub, with plant owners eager to cash in on the ₹2.90 per unit purchase price being offered by the Tamil Nadu Electricity Board.

Architecture

The architecture of Nagercoil consists of an eclectic combination of architectural styles, ranging from those that predate the creation of the town, from the early Dravidian architecture and Kerala Architecture, to English Gothic Revival, to the 21st century contemporary. Although there are prehistoric and classical structures in the city, the architectural history of Nagercoil effectively begins with the first small settlements from 3 A.D. The Roman naturalist and writer Pliny the Elder mentions Nagercoil as a commercial metropolis, having trade links with his contemporaneous Roman merchants, who traded and stayed in unique rock-walled, clay-roofed structures. This legacy can be found in some of the town's old heritage structures like the Nagaraja Temple, Nagercoil. The temple has two main deities, Krishna (revered as Ananda Krishna) and Nagaraja. The upadevathas are Shiva, Subrahmanya Swami, Ganesha, Devi, and Dwarapalaka. As an ancient tradition, the priests are Namboothiri Brahmins who are referred by the Pambumekkat mana in Thrissur, Kerala. The 14th century St. Francis Xavier's Cathedral, Kottar serves as a testimony to the mix of Roman and native architecture. While Saint Xavier was doing missionary work at Kottar and its neighborhood, he averted an invasion of Padagas with the help of his cross alone and thus protected the people of the Venad kingdom from that attack which was appreciated by the king, Unni Kerala Varma, who became closer to the priest and befriended him from then on. In recognition of Xavier's services, the king allotted him a piece of land to construct a Catholic church, as a gesture of goodwill, as per the church records. There was already a small church, in the same place where St. Xavier's church stands at present, dedicated to Mary the Mother of God, since AD 1544. Later on, Dravidian and Kerala architectural styles began to appear in the area. This can be attributed to the construction of the Thanumalayan Temple in the 16th century.

The brilliant artistic influence of Kerala and British architecture marvels are seen in the Nagercoil Palace, Nagercoil Clock Tower, Home Church, Scott Christian College, Scott School, Carmel Higher Secondary School, St. Joseph Convent, Sethu Lakshmi Bai School, Nagercoil Court, The Concordia Seminary, Filter House, The Salvation Army Catherine Booth Hospital and many more heritage structures in and around the town. Among these, the Nagercoil Clock Tower is the most visible to the outside world, situated in the heart of the town, which was built to commemorate the visit of Sri Moolam Thirunal, the ruler of Travancore, in 1893, and was designed by Hogeorf and S. Horesly of England. The Maharajah himself inaugurated it on 15 February of that year. The pendulum of the clock was made in Derbyshire by Smith of Derby Group, London. The clock is attached to a 60-foot-long chain with a weight, operated with pulleys through gravitational force.
The clock in the Nagercoil Clock Tower was presented to the Maharajah by Rev. James Duthie. of the London Missionary Society.
The total cost for constructing the Nagercoil Clock Tower was ₹ 3,258, 9 Chakrams and 12 Kasu. The Maharajah of Travancore donated ₹ 1017, and the balance was donated by the public. However, the declining interest by the government to uphold and preserve the heritage monuments is a cause of concern to heritage enthusiasts and the citizens of the town. The fear, that with time, the extinction of this heritage will be imminent is growing with the demolition of a few structures.

Politics

Marshal Nesamony, one of the leading lawyers of the Nagercoil Bar, was elected as the Chairman of the Nagercoil Municipal Council in 1943. He enlarged the town boundary, improved the town's water supply system, established a home for destitutes and increased the income of the Nagercoil Municipality. In the same year, he was elected to the Travancore State Assembly and was also nominated to the Senate of the Kerala University, then known as the Travancore University. Later on K. Kamaraj, the former chief minister of Tamil Nadu, won from the Kanyakumari constituency without even canvassing. The Nagercoil (Lok Sabha constituency) is perhaps the only constituency in Tamil Nadu to not have elected any Dravidian parties in the state's history.

A.K. Chellaiya, was a politician and an MLA of Colachel constituency in 1952. He resigned his post for merging Kanyakumari with Tamil Nadu.

A. Samraj, was an MLA of Thovalai constituency in 1952. He resigned from his post for merging Kanyakumari with Tamil Nadu.

Education

Tamil is the official language in Nagercoil and is spoken by the majority of the population here. In addition to Tamil, English and Malayalam are widely spoken. There are many schools and colleges in Nagercoil that are known for their national reputation and were established more than 150 years ago; colleges such as Scott Christian College (est. 1809), South Travancore Hindu College (est. 1952), Holy Cross College (est. 1965), Women Christian College and schools such as Scott Christian Higher Secondary School (est. 1819), Duthie Girls School (est. 1819), St. Joseph's Convent Higher Secondary School (est. 1910), Carmel Higher Secondary School (est. 1922), S.L.B. Government Higher Secondary School (est. 1924), S.M.R.V. Higher Secondary School (est. 1919).

The literacy rate is at 96.99% higher than the national average of 74.04% and state average of 80.09%.

Culture

At Vadasery, a locality in Nagercoil, a unique Temple jewellery is made. The Vadasery Temple jewellery has Geographical Indications (GI) registry of the Government of India. These jewels are used by classical dancers in India.

Onam is a festival which is widely celebrated among the Malayalam-speaking population by drawing the 'athapoo' on the floor.

Navaratri is uniquely celebrated here with an inter-state tradition  in which the idols of Goddess Munuthithanankai Amman from Suchindrum, Goddess Saraswati from Padmanabhapuram Palace and Lord Kumaraswamy from Kumarakovil travel to Thiruvananthapuram. A ceremonial welcome is given to the idols of the Gods by the officials and representatives of the Government of Kerala. After the ten days of Navratri festival, they return to the respective temples with great celebrations.

Sports
Nagercoil has the distinction of housing one of the two Sports Authority of India Centers in the state, the other being in Chennai. There are plans to make the city hub for sports in South India by merging it with the Thiruvananthapuram and Kochi Centers with headquarters in Thiruvananthapuram.

Sports Development Authority of Tamil Nadu (SDAT) is maintaining Aringar Anna Outdoor Stadium in Vadasery and SDAT indoor Stadium in Konam, Nagercoil. It also has an excellent Swimming pool for sports players.

Nagercoil also has various sports clubs that promote various sports activities. Nagercoil Fencing Club  promotes fencing sports in nagercoil. 
Also there are various Non govt sports clubs like The District Club, The Nagercoil Club, Ramavarmapuram club, etc.

References

Notes

External links

 Official website of Kanyakumari district

 
Cities and towns in Kanyakumari district